LabWindows/CVI (CVI is short for C for Virtual Instrumentation) is an ANSI C programming environment for test and measurement developed by National Instruments. The program was originally released as LabWindows for DOS in 1987, but was soon revisioned (and renamed) for the Microsoft Windows platform. The current version of LabWindows/CVI (commonly referred to as CVI) is 2020.

LabWindows/CVI uses the same libraries and data-acquisition modules as the better known National Instrument product LabVIEW and is thus highly compatible with it.

LabWindows/CVI is targeted more at domain experts and scientists, and CVI more towards software engineers that are more comfortable with text-based linear languages such as C.

Release history 
Starting with LabWindows/CVI 8.0, major versions are released around the first week of August, to coincide with the annual National Instruments conference NI Week, and followed by a bug-fix release the following February.

In 2009, National Instruments started to name the releases after the year in which they are released. The bugfix is called a Service Pack (for instance, the 2009 Service Pack 1 release was published in February 2010).

See also
National Instruments

References

Integrated development environments
Domain-specific programming languages
C (programming language) compilers
Data analysis software
Numerical software
Cross-platform software